Shoot or Be Shot is a low-budget independent film that premiered in Minneapolis–Saint Paul, Minnesota on January 25, 2002. This comedy film satirizes the filmmaking movement Dogme 95. The idea for the film was inspired by The Producers and An Alan Smithee Film: Burn Hollywood Burn.

Shoot or Be Shot has a runtime of 90 minutes and was directed by J. Randall Argue. At the time of the film's theatrical release, two other films Shatner was involved with were nearing their release dates: Showtime, in which he acted as himself, and Groom Lake, which he directed.

Premise

William Shatner stars in the film as Harvey Wilkes, a patient who escapes from a psychiatric hospital to a desert, kidnaps a film crew there, and forces them to make a movie.

Release and reception

Shoot or Be Shot was released on DVD by 20th Century Fox Home Entertainment in May 2004. Ian Jane of DVD Talk gave the film a negative review, saying that the film is "just not funny". Michelle Fajkus of Hybrid Cinema, who also gave the film a negative review, wrote that the film promotes stereotypes with its use of stock characters, such as the dumb blonde. Jeff Strickler of the Star Tribune called the film "a low-rent version of Bowfinger".

References

External links
 
 

2002 films
2000s action comedy films
2000s crime comedy films
2002 independent films
American independent films
American action comedy films
American satirical films
American crime comedy films
Films about kidnapping
Dogme 95 films
Films about film directors and producers
Films produced by Ralph Winter
2002 comedy films
2000s English-language films
2000s American films